Stockport Central Library is a Carnegie library in Stockport Greater Manchester England. It was built in 1913-15 to designs by Bradshaw, Gass and Hope in the Edwardian Baroque style and as of 2018 continues to serve as Stockport's largest library.

Location
It is situated in the corner of St Petersgate and Wellington Road South. The north south axis of the town had changed in 1826 with the opening of the new bridge and the new turnpike, the straight wide Wellington Roads. That relieved the 1724 turnpike that used Lancashire Hill, Lancashire Bridge, Gt Underbank and Hillgate, of the Manchester to Derby through traffic. So in 1875 the market place and St Mary's church had lost their prestige. New civic buildings were planned for Wellington Road South. The first building on the St Petersgate, Wellington Road South site was a mechanics institute.

History
The first relevant date for public libraries was 1850 when the Public Libraries Act 1850 gave Municipal Boroughs such as Stockport the power to fund public libraries. The first Stockport Library was opened in 1875 in the market over the cheese hall. This less than satisfactory, an 1885 report stated "The ventilation of all the rooms is bad...There is not sufficient outlet for bad air 
which at certain times is overpowering. The air in the large reading room is particularly bad, being impregnated with the stench coming from the hall underneath". It was condemned in 1890 and replaced 23 years later.

In neighbouring Reddish, Houldsworth has built Baths, and a Library for his workers in 1907.

Stockport Central Library was built in 1913 with the assistance of Andrew Carnegie, a industrialist turned philanthropist. Andrew Carnegie (1835-1919) was born in Scotland and emigrated to America with his family in 1848. His father was a weaver and his mother was a shoemakers daughter. He worked in a cotton mill as a pirner (U.S. Bobbin boy) then as an engine tenter, a telegraph messenger and operator. He also worked as a telegraph operator on the American railways and foreseeing future demand for iron and steel, he founded his own company in 1873, concentrating on steel. His companies prospered despite a depression and in 1901 were consolidated, and sold forming the United States Steel Corporation.  With a personal fortune of  $480 million, he endowed 2509 libraries worldwide and 660 libraries in Britain.

Initially, Andrew Carnegie offered Stockport Corporation £10,000 for the erection of a free central library. The design was put out to competition and Bradshaw & Gass submitted a design costing £14,000. The Carnegie assessor, Percy S Worthington, award the 'premium' to them in October 1910. This was over budget, and Andrew Carnegie increased his offer to £15,000 on condition that the Corporation provided a further £2,000 to build a branch library in another part of the town. 

Tenders were sought in September 1911, the full design drawings were supplied in 1913, and the building was completed in 1914. The final statement of accounts show it cost £15,000.10.6d.

Building

It was built by Bradshaw Gass & Hope, one of a series of libraries the built on the strength of their design for Bolton Library. The library is of red brick and Portland stone, in the Edwardian Baroque style complete with prominent corner dome with a tall finial. The entrance is offset by one bay along the Wellington Road south elevation. This too is flanked by banded brick pilasters, and surmounted by heavy stone carvings. This and a symmetrically matching bay has a tall arched window, cornice and cartouche in the frieze. in between is a five-window range with an attic storey with small windows. A rusticated basement takes advantage of the fall of the land; the elevation to St Petersgate is broadly similar to the Wellington Street South elevation but with basement windows.
 
The ground floor library has arcades and a glazed dome supported by Ionic columns, with stained glass windows with the names of writers. It has been locally listed, as Building 473.

Facilities
In 2015 it functions as a reference library, a family history centre and a lending library six days a week on reduced hours, closing at 5.00pm on Wednesday and Thursday, and 4.00 on a Saturday but maintaining its service to 7.00pm on the other days.

See also
 Listed buildings in Stockport

References
Notes

Bibliography
 
 
 
 

Grade II listed buildings in the Metropolitan Borough of Stockport
Public libraries in Greater Manchester
Bradshaw, Gass & Hope buildings
Carnegie libraries in England